Oxford Parkway railway station is a railway station  at Water Eaton, Oxfordshire, on the Oxford–Bicester line. Full regular weekday service began on Monday 26 October 2015, although the first passengers travelled the previous day on a Sunday timetable.

The station, whose name was changed in September 2013 from the provisional "Water Eaton Parkway", lies between Kidlington and Oxford beside the existing Water Eaton park-and-ride site. It serves Kidlington, north Oxford and nearby villages. The station forms part of a multi-modal transport interchange node, connecting travellers by bus, cycle, on foot and by car with rail transport.  It is also intended to attract park-and-ride traffic from the busy A34, A40 and A44 roads.

Services to Oxford started on 11 December 2016.

Description
The station is part of Project Evergreen 3, funded and managed by Chiltern Railways. It is served every half-hour by trains from London . Chiltern Railways opened the station in October 2015 for trains towards Bicester and London Marylebone, with services to Oxford railway station beginning in December 2016, delayed from Spring 2016 as locals objected to the extra noise that would be caused. The journey time to London is about an hour.  Network Rail completed the final track upgrades on this portion of the route in September 2016 allowing driver training runs on the line ahead of the inauguration of new services on 11 December.

The station is on the site of the Buckinghamshire Railway's temporary Oxford Banbury Road terminus (1850–51), and north-east of the site of the former  (1905–26). In 1942 a Government grain silo was built next to the site as part of a Second World War network to concentrate scarce food and distribute it by rail. It was in use until the late 1980s. In October 2013 Chiltern Railways had it demolished as part of site preparation for the new station and car park.

Water Eaton Park-and-Ride is immediately adjacent, with bus services to central Oxford and to the Headington hospitals (Monday to Friday only).

The station lies on National Cycle Route 51, which links Oxford to Bicester and further East.  Oxford Parkway has covered two-level parking for 152 pedal cycles adjacent to the entrance, additional to the existing cycle parking at the nearby Park & Ride.  It has CCTV surveillance.

The car park has 815 standard spaces, plus 41 spaces for passengers with reduced mobility. There is realtime information about remaining available spaces.  There is a fee to park a car but the first hour is free.  There are also spaces for 30 motorcycles.

Purchase of rail travel tickets is by machine; there is no ticket office at the station, but there is an information desk. Toilet and refreshment facilities are also present.

Grain silo 
Prior to the station's construction, the site was occupied by a large grain silo. This followed a standard pattern common to other wartime silos, taking the form of two banks of ten seven-storey high cylindrical reinforced concrete silos side by side with the space between them filled by a brick access shaft. In the shaft there were associated grain handling machinery and two enormous grain driers which extended the full height of the building. It was built in the early 1940s and closed in the late 1980s, after which the yard surrounding it was used by several local businesses including a pet food supplier and a car breaker.

Construction

Building of the station began in late October 2014 and was sufficiently advanced for services to begin 12 months later.

Services
All services at Oxford Parkway are operated by Chiltern Railways. The current off-peak service in trains per hour is:
 2 tph to London Marylebone
 2 tph to

References

External links

Chiltern Railways official home page
Evergreen 3 Project

Railway stations in Great Britain opened in 2015
Railway stations in Oxfordshire
Railway stations opened by Network Rail
Railway stations served by Chiltern Railways
East West Rail